Gold is a commercial radio station based in Bendigo and Central Victoria. It is currently part of Australian Radio Network. Formerly branded "Easymix", the station broadcasts on 1071 AM, across parts of Central Victoria including Bendigo, Ballarat, Maryborough, Castlemaine and Daylesford. It also broadcasts on 98.3 FM, which covers a 25-30 kilometre radius in the Bendigo region.

Radio station 3CV began broadcasting on the 1071 AM frequency in 1938, but Gold was never technically 3CV, because that call sign had been relinquished when 3CV was given a Section 39 supplementary FM licence and became Star FM, now known as Hit 91.9. The discarded 1071 AM frequency was purchased by a solo operator and became "Easy Listening 1071". Several years later, it was sold and re-branded as "Easymix 1071", after the owner of 3BO (now Triple M) and 3CV (now Hit 91.9) sold off its 1071 AM service, deciding to keep the Section 39 supplementary FM licence. On 1 August 2014, EasyMix re-branded to "Gold".

In November 2021, Gold, along with other stations owned by Grant Broadcasters, was acquired by the Australian Radio Network. The deal, which was finalised on 4 January 2022, allowed Grant's stations, including Gold, to access ARN's iHeartRadio platform in regional areas. According to a media release from ARN, it was expected that Gold would integrate with ARN's Pure Gold Network, but would retain its name. It was thought that the deal included a clause not allowing ARN to reduce staffing levels for two years.

References

Gold Central Victoria
Gold Central Victoria
Gold Central Victoria
Gold
Bendigo